Håkan Ericsson is a Swedish Paralympian and wheelchair racer. At the age of 21, Ericsson won the 1990 London Marathon, barely edging out German athlete Wolfgang Peterson to set a new course record. Ericsson competed in the 1988, 1992, and 2000 Summer Paralympics, winning a total of one gold, four silver, and four bronze medals. He was coached by Peter Eriksson from 1983 to the end of his career.

References

External links
 

Year of birth missing (living people)
Living people
Swedish wheelchair racers
Paralympic athletes of Sweden
Athletes (track and field) at the 1988 Summer Paralympics
Athletes (track and field) at the 1992 Summer Paralympics
Athletes (track and field) at the 2000 Summer Paralympics
Paralympic gold medalists for Sweden
Paralympic silver medalists for Sweden
Paralympic bronze medalists for Sweden
Male wheelchair racers
Paralympic wheelchair racers
Medalists at the 1988 Summer Paralympics
Medalists at the 1992 Summer Paralympics
Medalists at the 2000 Summer Paralympics
Paralympic medalists in athletics (track and field)
Medalists at the World Para Athletics Championships
20th-century Swedish people